Tash-Bulak is a village in Osh Region of Kyrgyzstan. It is part of the Nookat District. Its population was 229 in 2021.

References

Populated places in Osh Region